Gol Pashin (also Romanized as Gol Pāshīn; also known as Gol Parchīn) is a village in Bakeshluchay Rural District, in the Central District of Urmia County, West Azerbaijan Province, Iran. At the 2006 census, its population was 266, in 69 families.  
Gol Pashin is an Assyrian village  and has 1 surviving church, although before it was destroyed in 1918 it had many more, and was a much grander and significant town overall.

For the pre Assyrian genocide history of the town, see Gulpashan.

See also
 Assyrians in Iran
 List of Assyrian settlements

References 

Populated places in Urmia County
Assyrian settlements